Grindrod is a surname of English origin.

People with the name
Barton Grindrod (1834–1895), Australian cricketer
David Grindrod, British theatre and television casting director, primarily working with Andrew Lloyd Webber
John Grindrod (bishop) (1919–2009), English-born Australian Anglican bishop
Kelly Grindrod, Canadian pharmacist
Nic Grindrod (born 1975), English racing driver
Peter Grindrod (born 1959), British mathematician
Phil Grindrod (fl. 1932–1963), British cinematographer

See also
 Grindrod (disambiguation)

References

English toponymic surnames